The women's 880 yards event at the 1966 British Empire and Commonwealth Games was held on 11 and 13 August at the Independence Park in Kingston, Jamaica. It was the last time that the imperial distance was contested at the Games later being replaced by the 800 metres.

Medalists

Results

Heats

Qualification: First 4 in each heat (Q) qualify directly for the final.

Final

References

Athletics at the 1966 British Empire and Commonwealth Games
1966